The Sheffield Downtown Commercial Historic District is a historic district in downtown Sheffield, Alabama. The buildings in the district were mostly built from 1888 to 1959 and have served a variety of purposes. Significant commercial buildings in the district include the Sheffield Hardware Company building, the Blake Building, and the Montgomery Block. Many of the city's important government buildings, including the Fire Department-City Hall building, Chamber of Commerce, and post office, are also part of the district. Various architectural styles can be seen in the district, including Renaissance Revival, High Victorian Gothic, and Moderne. The district was added to the National Register of Historic Places on May 24, 2010.

References

National Register of Historic Places in Colbert County, Alabama
Victorian architecture in Alabama
Renaissance Revival architecture in Alabama
Streamline Moderne architecture in the United States
Historic districts in Colbert County, Alabama
Historic districts on the National Register of Historic Places in Alabama